The Legend of the Reno Brothers is a 2013 American Western documentary film by Hangman's Crossing Productions starring Morgan Rague. The world's first three peacetime train robberies were carried out by Frank and John Reno in Seymour, Indiana. The Reno Gang became so successful the Adams Express Company and railroad tycoons hired Allan Pinkerton to bring them to justice.

Plot
The Reno Brothers Gang were largely a group of criminals and war veterans that operated in the Midwest during and after the Civil War. They carried out the first peacetime train robbery in world history years before Jesse James and Billy the Kid gained notoriety. Ten members of the gang, including three brothers, were illegally lynched while in official protective custody of the US Government. Afterwards, a firestorm of international protests from Great Britain and Canada ensued. Ultimately, no one was ever identified or prosecuted for the murders. This new documentary examines the root cause of a small, rural Midwestern town in anarchy; not only due to the Reno Gang's crimes, but the secret formation of the Jackson County Vigilance Committee otherwise known as the Masked Halters or the Red Mask Society.

Production
This documentary film was shot in New Albany, Milltown, Seymour, Laconia, Corydon and Scottsburg, Indiana as well as Louisville, Kentucky.

External links
 
 
 Reno Brothers Weekend with screening of movie; WBIW 1340 AM Bedford, Indiana; retrieved January 3, 2014
 Top Quirky Destinations to Visit in Indiana (#4), Indianapolis Star, May 8, 2014
 Background on the genesis of the film and the Executive Producer
 Movie information including trailer; Bluegrass Today; retrieved January 3, 2014
 Roundabout Madison (Indiana) article on the making of the movie; retrieved February 4, 2014

2013 films
Films set in Indiana
American Western (genre) films
American documentary films
2013 Western (genre) films
2010s English-language films
2010s American films